Middle Township is one of twelve townships in Hendricks County, Indiana, United States. As of the 2010 census, its population was 6,170.

History
Middle Township was organized in 1833.

Geography

Cities and towns
 Brownsburg (west edge)
 Pittsboro

Unincorporated towns
 Maplewood
 Tilden
(This list is based on USGS data and may include former settlements.)

Adjacent townships
 Harrison Township, Boone County (north)
 Perry Township, Boone County (northeast)
 Brown Township (east)
 Lincoln Township (southeast)
 Washington Township (southeast)
 Center Township (southwest)
 Union Township (west)

Cemeteries
The township contains six cemeteries: Hughes, Long, Roberts, Saint Malachy West, Weaver and White Lick Baptist.

Major highways
  Interstate 74
  U.S. Route 136

References
 U.S. Board on Geographic Names (GNIS)
 United States Census Bureau cartographic boundary files

External links

Townships in Hendricks County, Indiana
Townships in Indiana